Giannis, Yiannis or Ioannis Papadopoulos may refer to:
 Giannis Papadopoulos (footballer, born 1989)
 Giannis Papadopoulos (footballer, born 1998)
 Yiannis Papadopoulos (guitarist)
 Ioannis Papadopoulos (chess player)